Joshua Mauga  (born June 20, 1987) is a former American football linebacker. He was signed by the New York Jets as an undrafted free agent in 2009. He played college football at Nevada. His surname Mauga translates to mean Mountain from Polynesian languages.

Early years
Mauga was born in Fallon, Nevada. He graduated in 2005 from Churchill County High School where he earned All-State and All-region honors. He was also the top heavyweight wrestler in the state of Nevada.

College career
Mauga was named to The Sporting News All-Freshman team in 2005 after play all season games and notched 32 tackles. In 2006 was second on the team with 56 tackles and also intercepted 3 passes.  He moved from outside linebacker to the inside linebacker position in that year.  In 2007, he was the WAC leader in tackles before an MCL injury kept him out, he tied on second on team tackles with 82.  He was named team captain, an honor rarely bestowed on a junior at Nevada. In his senior season he entered as a contender for WAC Defensive Player of the Year.  He played through a torn pectoral muscle managing 54 tackles, 7.5 for loss and 3.5 sacks.  He underwent surgery on his torn pectoral muscle on December 17 that cost him playing in the 2008 Humanitarian Bowl.

Professional career

Pre-draft
Mauga left Nevada alongside Marko Mitchell for the 2009 NFL Draft.  He was limited to cardiovascular training and lower body weightlifting to be ready for the Nevada Pro Day.

New York Jets

2009
On August 16, 2009, Mauga signed with the New York Jets. He was waived/injured on August 28 and subsequently reverted to injured reserve, only to be released with an injury settlement on September 1.

Mauga was re-signed to the Jets' practice squad on December 10, 2009, but released December 20.

2010
He was re-signed to a future contract on January 6, 2010.

On September 3, 2010, the Jets waived Mauga who was unable to practice during training camp due to a concussion. Mauga was signed to the team's practice squad on September 6, 2010.

Mauga debuted for the Jets against the Green Bay Packers. On October 9, 2012, he was placed on injured reserve after suffering a torn pectoral muscle during a game against the Houston Texans on Monday Night Football.

Kansas City Chiefs
Mauga signed with the Kansas City Chiefs on July 24, 2014. On August 30, 2016, he was placed on injured reserve. On July 6, 2017, Mauga re-signed with the Chiefs. He was released on August 28, 2017.

Filmography

Film

References

External links
 New York Jets bio
 Nevada Wolf Pack football bio
 Joshua Mauga IMDB Biography

1987 births
Living people
People from Fallon, Nevada
Players of American football from Nevada
American sportspeople of Samoan descent
American football linebackers
Nevada Wolf Pack football players
New York Jets players
Kansas City Chiefs players